Viscum minimum is a species of mistletoe in the family Santalaceae. It is a parasitic plant native to South Africa.

Description
In its native habitat Viscum minimum uses two species of succulents, Euphorbia polygona and Euphorbia horrida, as host plants. However, given the opportunity, the plant uses a range of succulents, including cacti, as hosts. 

A mature Viscum minimum consists mostly of haustoria within the host plant, but a small stems of less than one millimeter in length with a single whorl of 2-3 scale-like leaves. A single flower, and later a red round fruit with a diameter of 8-9 millimeters, emerges from these stems. The leaves and stems are capable of photosynthesis, making the plant technically a hemiparasite.

The Viscum minimum mitochondrial genome has been sequenced, showing an unusual loss of genes or their functions.

Seed germination

Literature
 William Henry Harvey: Flora Capensis 2: 581
 Robert Allen Dyer: Two Rare Parasites on Succulent Species of Euphorbia, Euphorbia Review Vol. I (4): 29-32, 1935
 Thomas Goebel: Viscum minimum Harvey in der Sukkulentensammlung der Stadt Zürich, Kakteen und andere Sukkulenten 29 (1), 1978
 Frank K. Horwood: Two parasites of Euphorbia: Viscum minimum and Hydnora africana, The Euphorbia Journal, Vol 1: 45-48, 1983

References

minimum
Parasitic plants